Welcome Joy is the second full-length album from Seattle indie folk group The Cave Singers. It was released August 18, 2009, on Matador Records.

Track listing

Personnel
 Pete Quirk – vocals, guitar
 Derek Fudesco – guitar, bass
 Marty Lund – drums, guitar

References

2009 albums
The Cave Singers albums
Matador Records albums